The Nobel Committee for Physiology or Medicine is the Nobel Committee responsible for proposing laureates for the Nobel Prize for Physiology or Medicine. The Nobel Committee for Physiology or Medicine is appointed by the Nobel Assembly at Karolinska Institutet, a body of 50 members at Karolinska Institutet which is formally a separate body not part of the institute itself. It usually consists of Swedish professors of physiology or medical subjects active at Karolinska Institutet, although the Assembly in principle could appoint anyone to the committee. Other than the five ordinary members, ten associated members are appointed each year, for that year only.

The committee is a working body that invites nominations and evaluates candidates nominated for the Nobel Prize. The final decision to award the Nobel Prize for Physiology or Medicine is taken by the Nobel Assembly at Karolinska Institutet and based on a proposal from the Nobel Committee.

Controversies 
Over the years, there have been many controversies concerned with the process by which nominations and awards of the Nobel Prize. To avoid any possible appearance of bias, the Nobel Committee states that once 50 years has passed since the time of nomination, it will make the criteria for the selection of award recipients public. Currently (August 2, 2011) the Nobel Prize award site is more than 10 years late in providing these criteria. See Nobel Prize controversies.

Current members 
The members for 2023 of the committee are:

 Gunilla Karlsson-Hedestam, chair, elected 2019
 Olle Kämpe, vice chair, elected 2020
 Per Svenningsson, elected 2021
 Sten Linnarsson, elected 2022
 Abdel El-Manira, elected for 2023

Secretary 

Thomas Perlmann is the permanent secretary since 2016.

The secretary is in charge of the organization for the Nobel Committee and Assembly. He participates ex officio in their meetings and is usually their representative on the board of the Nobel Foundation.

Former secretaries 
Göran Liljestrand, 1918–1960
Ulf von Euler, 1960–1965
Bengt Gustavsson, 1966–1978
Jan Lindsten, 1979–1990
Alf Lindberg, 1991–1992
Nils Ringertz, 1992–1999
Hans Jörnvall, 2000–2008
Göran K. Hansson, 2009–2014
Urban Lendahl, 2015–2016

Former members 

Karl Mörner, 1900–?
Carl Sundberg, 1904–1916
Johan Erik Johansson, 1904–? (chairman 1918–?)
Frithiof Lennmalm, 1908–1910, 1917–1918 and 1920–?
Jules Åkerman, 1911–?
Edvard Welander, 1911–?
Johan Albin Dalén, 1911–?
Bror Gadelius, 1914–?
Frans Westermark, 1914–?
John Sjöqvist, 1918–1928
Gunnar Hedrén, ?–1922
Einar Hammarsten, 1929–?
Alfred Pettersson, 1932–1934
Folke Henschen, 1935–?
Gunnar Holmgren, 1938–?
Göran Liljestrand, 1938–?
Viktor Wigert, 1938–?
Gösta Häggqvist, around 1940
Hilding Bergstrand, ?–1952 (chairman 1947–1952)
Ulf von Euler, 1953–1960 (chairman 1958–1960)
Axel Westman, 1955–?
Hugo Theorell, 1958–?
Carl-Axel Hamberger, 1961–1966
Erling Norrby, 1975–1980
Rolf Zetterström, 1975–?
David Ottoson, 1974–1984 (chairman 1982–1984)
Nils Ringertz, 1981–1987 (chairman 1985–1987)
Sten Orrenius, 1983–2002
Jan Wersäll, 1984–1990
Bengt Samuelsson, 1984–? (chairman 1987–89)
Tomas Hökfelt, 1985–?
Hans Wigzell, 1987–1992 (chairman 1990–1992)
Sten Grillner, 1987-1997 (chairman 1995–1997)
Gösta Gahrton, 1988-1997 (vice chairman 1995–1996; chairman 1997)
Ralf F. Pettersson, 1995–2000 (chairman 1998–2000)
Staffan Normark, 1996–2001
Sten Lindahl, 1997–2002 (chairman 2001–2002)
Bo Angelin, 1998–2003 (chairman 2003)
Björn Vennström, 2001–2006
Göran K. Hansson, 2002–2007 (chairman 2004–2006)
Erna Möller, 2003–2005
Lars Terenius, 2003–2005 
Nils-Göran Larsson, 2006–2008
Bertil Fredholm, 2004–2009 (chairman 2007–2008)
 Klas Kärre, 2006–2011 (chairman 2009–11)
 Carlos Ibáñez, 2008–2011
 Urban Lendahl, 2007–2012 (chairman 2012)
 Jan Andersson, 2008–2013
 Rune Toftgård, elected 2010-2014
 Anna Wedell 2013-2018 (chair 2017–2018)
 Patrik Ernfors 2015-2020 (chair 2019–2020)
 Nils-Göran Larsson 2017-2022 (chair 2021–2022)

References 

Nobel Prize in Physiology or Medicine
Karolinska Institute
Awards juries and committees